The Unjust (lit. "Bad deal" or "Unfair trade") is a 2010 South Korean action crime film by Ryoo Seung-wan. It is a dark and bitter denunciation of corruption in the South Korean justice system.

It was a critical and commercial success, with 2.7 million admissions at the box office and winning several awards, including Best Film, Best Director and Best Screenplay at the 2011 Blue Dragon Film Awards.

This is director Ryoo Seung-wan's fifth collaboration with his younger brother, actor Ryoo Seung-bum. Lead actors Hwang Jung-min and Ryoo Seung-bum previously worked together in Bloody Tie (2006).

Plot

After the rape and murder of 5 elementary schoolgirls, a crime which deeply upsets the entire country, a fleeing suspect is shot and killed by the police. This leads to bad publicity because the guilt of the suspect cannot be proved, and the real attacker may still be at large. Under pressure from the Blue House, a senior police official assigns Choi, a police captain, on a highly sensitive mission, namely to find a former child rapist who can take the blame. Choi, in return, is promised a promotion and the dismissal of an internal investigation against him, which was caused by his brother-in-law receiving money from Jang, a corrupt businessman. Meanwhile, a corrupt prosecutor named Joo cancels the criminal charges, brought about by an investigation lead by Choi, against a corrupt businessman named Kim, who is also Jang's rival in a bid for a construction deal.

Choi searches through several profiles of rapists, and having settled upon Lee, a school-bus driver, he enlists Jang and his henchmen to kid-nap Lee and coach him in how the confession should be delivered. At the same time Jang takes photographs of Kim and Joo playing golf, and has a henchman approach Kim and murder him. The photographs are mailed to Joo to ensure that Jang will never be prosecuted. At the police station, Lee is denied immunity to the death penalty, and as such, reneges on the deal and tells Joo the truth. In response, Jang sends the earlier henchman to suffer arrest and murder Lee from within the jail. This makes Joo furious and he investigates Choi, with the help of a corrupt journalist, finding evidence of his and Jang's partnership. Choi, in response, pleads with Joo not to dismantle his career, and the two agree on a truce.

Meanwhile, Jang, who is tired of being black-mailed by Choi, has saved recordings of Lee's coaching session, and black-mails Choi in return. Choi reacts by murdering Jang using a rigged elevator, and pretends to make peace with Jang's assistant before murdering him as well. However, this incident is seen by Choi's lieutenant, who wrestles with Choi and tries to stop him. During the struggle, Choi accidentally kills his lieutenant, and afterward stabs the dead body with a knife, so that the police will assume that Jang's assistant and the lieutenant killed each other. As Choi receives his promotion and the lieutenant's family mourns, Choi's subordinates become suspicious and privately capture another one of Jang's henchmen, who served as Jang's videographer and who recorded Jang's death and the ensuing fight. Ironically, DNA testing finally succeeds on the body of one of the girls mentioned earlier, and Lee is proved as the real attacker all along. Nonetheless, the subordinates release the video of the coaching to prove Choi's connection with Jang, and what is more, they order Jang's henchman to ambush Choi at a charnel house and murder him in revenge. The final segment shows that they also released the golf photographs, but in spite of the media reporting that charges will be filed, Joo meets with his father-in-law, a senior official who calmly assures him that everything will be alright.

Cast

Hwang Jung-min ... Police captain Choi Cheol-gi
Ryoo Seung-bum ... Public prosecutor (D.A.) Joo Yang
Yoo Hae-jin  ... Gangster/businessman Jang Seok-gu
Chun Ho-jin ... Police bureau chief Kang
Shin Soo-yeon ... Tae-ra
Ma Dong-seok ... Police lieutenant Ma Dae-ho
Woo Don-gi ... Lee Dong-seok, the scapegoat
Jo Yeong-jin  ... TK chairman Kim Yang-su
Jung Man-sik ... Assistant D.A. Gong
Lee Sung-min ... Chief prosecutor/D.A.
Kim Su-hyeon ... Soo-il
Gu Bon-woong ... Yoon-jjang
Kim Min-jae ... Detective Lee
Lee Hee-joon ... Detective Nam
Oh Jung-se ... Reporter Kim
Lee Jong-ju ... Representative Goh
Baek Seung-ik ... killer
Song Sae-byeok ... Cheol-gi's brother-in-law
Go Seo-hee ... Cheol-gi's younger sister
Kwak Ja-hyeong ... Detective Kwak
Jo Jong-geun ... Detective Jo
Kim Gi-cheon ... old inspector
Lee Do-hyeon ... young inspector
Hwang Byeong-guk ... defense counsel
Lee Kyoung-mi ... forensic examiner
Kim Weon-beom ... squad leader Park
Kang Hyeon-joong ... squad member
Jo Ha-seok ... squad members
Lee Mi-do ... Dong-seok's wife
Park Ha-yeong ... Dong-seok's daughter
Kim Seung-hun ... Yu Min-cheol
Jung Jin-gak ... President of South Korea
Kim Hye-ji ... Joo Yang's wife
Park Seo-yeon ... Joo Yang's hostess
Kang Hae-in ... Reporter Kim's hostess
Ahn Gil-kang ... team leader
Lee Chun-yeon ... National Police Agency head
Lee Joon-ik ... President Jeong
Jo Cheol-hyeon ... Haedong investor
Oh Seung-hyeon ... Haedong investor

Film festivals
The Unjust has screened at numerous film festivals around the world, including the Panorama section of the 61st Berlin International Film Festival, the Hong Kong International Film Festival, the Shanghai International Film Festival, the New York Asian Film Festival, the Fantasia Festival, the Hawaii International Film Festival, the Vladivostok International Film Festival - Pacific Meridian, the Sitges Film Festival, the London Korean Film Festival, and the Udine Far East Film Festival.

Awards and nominations

References

External links
  
 The Unjust at Naver 
 The Unjust at CJ Entertainment
 
 
 

2010 films
2010 crime thriller films
2010 action thriller films
South Korean crime thriller films
South Korean action thriller films
South Korean serial killer films
Police detective films
Films shot in Busan
Films directed by Ryoo Seung-wan
2010s Korean-language films
Best Picture Blue Dragon Film Award winners
South Korean crime action films
2010 crime action films
2010s serial killer films
2010s South Korean films